Susanabad (also Romanized as Sūsanābād) is a village in Mashhad-e Miqan Rural District, in the Central District of Arak County, Markazi Province, Iran. At the 2006 census, its population was 454, in 117 families.

References 

Populated places in Arak County